Naupactus is an ancient Greek town.

Naupactus may also refer to:
 Nafpaktos, the modern town built upon the site of ancient Naupactus
 the Battle of Naupactus, a 429 BCE Athenian victory in the Peloponnesian War  
 the beetle genus Naupactus (beetle) of the family Curculionidae

See also 
 Lepanto (disambiguation)
 Battle of Lepanto (disambiguation)